High treason is criminal disloyalty to one's government. 

High Treason may also refer to:

Arts, entertainment, and media

Films
 High Treason (1929 British film), a British adaptation of Billing's play, by Maurice Elvey
 High Treason (1929 German film), a German silent film directed by Johannes Meyer 
 High Treason (1951 film), a British espionage thriller by Roy Boulting

Literature
 "High Treason" (short story), a 1966 story by Poul Anderson
 High Treason, a 1927 play by Noel Pemberton Billing

Music
 "High Treason", a song from White Line by Memorain 
 "High Treason", a song from Did Tomorrow Come... by Sirrah

Other arts, entertainment, and media
 "High Treason" (The Adventures of Brisco County, Jr.), a two-part episode of The Adventures of Brisco County, Jr.
 Act of War: High Treason, a 2006 expansion pack for the video game Act of War: Direct Action

Other uses
 High Treason Incident, a 1910 plot to assassinate the Japanese Emperor Meiji

See also
Traitor (disambiguation)
Treason (disambiguation)